Vortex Towers, or Vortex Hotel Suites & Residences is a 58-storey,  tall residential skyscraper located at Kuala Lumpur, Malaysia. Construction of the skyscraper began in 2014 and was completed in 2016. The construction project was developed by Monoland Corporation, a Malaysian-based property developer that was previously involved in other skyscraper projects in Penang, notably 8 Gurney. The development consists of 248 apartment units.

References

See also
List of tallest buildings in Malaysia
List of tallest buildings in Kuala Lumpur

Residential skyscrapers in Malaysia
Buildings and structures in Kuala Lumpur
Buildings and structures completed in 2016
2016 establishments in Malaysia